Donald Brochu is an American film editor.

Career 
After assisting in the editing of a Cheech and Chong film in 1981 and 1982, Don Brochu was given an opportunity by Hal Ashby to be in charge of the editing himself. He continued to edit cinematic features throughout the eighties and nineties and was nominated for an Academy Award for Best Film Editing in 1994. Since the turn of the century he has mainly been editing television films. He has worked with the director Ron Underwood several times and is a frequent collaborator of Kenny Ortega.
Don Brochu is a member of the American Cinema Editors.

Selected filmography 
As editor
 The Slugger's Wife (1985)
 Born in East L.A. (1987)
 La Bamba (1987)
 Mystic Pizza (1988)
 Lock Up (1989)
 Out for Justice (1991)
 Under Siege (1992)
 Beyond the Law (1992)
 A Midnight Clear (1992)
 The Fugitive (1993)
 On Deadly Ground (1994)
 Chain Reaction (1996)
 Volcano (1997)
 Dudley Do-Right (1999)
 Blast from the Past (1999)
 Ready to Run (2000)
 The First $20 Million Is Always the Hardest (2002)
 The Medallion (2003)
 10.5 (2004)
 In the Mix (2005)
 10.5: Apocalypse (2006)
 Santa Baby (2006)
 High School Musical (2006)
 Holiday in Handcuffs (2007)
 High School Musical 3: Senior Year (2008)
 Michael Jackson's This Is It (2009)
 My Fake Fiancé (2009)
 Santa Baby 2 (2009)
 Beauty & the Briefcase (2010)
 How to Build a Better Boy (2014)
 Descendants (2015)
 The Rocky Horror Picture Show: Let's Do the Time Warp Again (2016)
 A Change of Heart (2017)
 Descendants 2 (2017)
 Descendants 3 (2019)

As an editing assistant
 Cheech & Chong's Nice Dreams (1981)
 Things Are Tough All Over (1982)
 Tootsie (1982)
 Spacehunter: Adventures in the Forbidden Zone (1983)
 Against All Odds (1984)
 Out of Africa (1985)
 Alien Nation (1988)
 Tuesdays with Morrie (1999)
 Cloud 9 (2014)

Awards 
 66th Academy Awards: Academy Award for Best Film Editing - The Fugitive (nominated)
 1994: British Academy Film Award Best Editing - The Fugitive (nominated)
 American Cinema Editors
 Eddie Award 1994 - The Fugitive (nominated)
 Eddie Award 2010 - Michael Jackson's This Is It (nominated)

References

External links 

Living people
American film editors
Year of birth missing (living people)